The Repealing and Amending Act, 2016 is an Act of the Parliament of India that repealed 295 Acts, and also made minor amendments to the Sexual Harassment of Women at the Work Place (Prevention, Prohibition and Redressal) Act, 2013, and the Governors (Emoluments, Allowances and Privileges) Amendment Act, 2014. The Act was the third such repealing act tabled by the Narendra Modi administration aimed at repealing obsolete laws.

Background and legislative history
Prime Minister Narendra Modi advocated the repeal of old laws during his 2014 general election campaign. At the 2015 Economic Times Global Business Summit, Modi stated, "Our country suffers from an excess of old and unnecessary laws which obstruct people and businesses. We began the exercise of identifying unnecessary laws and repealing them. 1,877 Central laws have been identified for repeal."

The Repealing and Amending (Fourth) Bill, 2015 was introduced in the Lok Sabha on 27 July 2015 by the Minister of Law and Justice, D.V. Sadananda Gowda. The bill sought to repeal 295 Acts, including over 20 Acts enacted before independence, and pass amendments to two Acts. The Bill sought to replace the term "Local Complaints Committee" with "Local Committee", and "Internal Complaints Committee" with "Internal Committee" in the Sexual Harassment of Women at the Work Place (Prevention, Prohibition and Redressal) Act, 2013.

The bill was passed by the Lok Sabha on 6 August 2015. Before being passed, the Lok Sabha officially renamed the bill as the Repealing and Amending (Third) Bill, 2015. The Bill, as passed by the Lok Sabha, was passed by the Rajya Sabha on 27 April 2016. The bill received assent from President Pranab Mukherjee on 6 May, and was notified in The Gazette of India on 9 May 2016.

Repealed Acts
The 295 Acts included in the bill's First Schedule were completely repealed.

See also
 List of legislations repealed under Modi government

References

Law of India
Modi administration
2016 in law
2016 in India
Repealed Indian legislation
Acts of the Parliament of India 2016